Four Seasons Hotels Limited, trading as Four Seasons Hotels and Resorts, is an international luxury hotel and resort company headquartered in Toronto, Ontario, Canada. Four Seasons currently operates more than 100 hotels and resorts worldwide. Since 2007, Bill Gates (through Cascade Investment) and Prince Al-Waleed bin Talal (through Kingdom Holding Company) have been majority owners of the company. As of January 2022, Cascade Investment owns 71.25% and Kingdom Holding Company owns 23.75%.

History

Canadian businessman Isadore Sharp founded Four Seasons in 1960.  While a young architect working for his father, Sharp designed a motel for a family friend; its success motivated him to try creating his own hotel.  He bought a large parcel of land in a run-down area of Toronto and planned a stopover for business travelers; the Four Seasons Motor Hotel opened in 1961 with initial investors, Murray Koffler, Fred Eisen, and Eddie Creed.

Four Seasons built more hotels, including the 1963 Inn on the Park, a $4 million two-story resort hotel in suburban Toronto that housed Canada's first discothèque.

Upscale luxury became part of the brand when the company expanded to London.  When a developer approached Four Seasons about building a hotel in London, Sharp planned it to compete with the city's old-world, elite hotels, such as Claridge's and The Connaught. The Inn on the Park hotel in London opened in 1970.

The lead consultant was the architecture firm Aedas.

In 1974, cost overruns at the Four Seasons Hotel Vancouver nearly led the company into bankruptcy.  As a result, the company began shifting to its current, management-only business model, eliminating costs associated with buying land and buildings.  The company went public in 1986. In the 1990s, Four Seasons and Ritz-Carlton began direct competition, with Ritz-Carlton emphasizing a uniform look while Four Seasons emphasized local architecture and styles with uniform service; in the end Four Seasons gained market share.

Built in 1986, Four Seasons Hotel Austin is a nine-story hotel on 2.3 acres of land on the Lady Bird Lake's north shore. In 1997, Four Seasons Hotel Austin became the first hotel to have "a high-speed wireless Internet network" after Wayport, Inc. set it up there for testing wireless Internet networks. The hotel hosted Queen Elizabeth II in 1991 when she visited Texas. It was acquired by Anbang Insurance Group from the Blackstone Group for $359.7 million in 2016.

Economic downturns in the early and mid-2000s affected the company. When the September 11 attacks caused the collapse of the travel industry, Four Seasons refused to cut room prices in order to preserve the perceived value of the brand, which caused tension with property owners who were losing money.  The company recovered, and in 2007 it agreed to a buyout by Microsoft Chairman Bill Gates and Prince Al-Waleed bin Talal of Saudi Arabia for $3.8 billion. The pair own 95 percent of the company, in equal shares, and Sharp owns the rest.

Challenges returned again during the financial crisis of 2007–2010.  The company made the first corporate layoffs in its history, cutting 10% of its Toronto workforce. In April 2010, after a year-long dispute with Broadreach Capital Partners and Maritz, Wolff & Co., owners of the Aviara resort near San Diego, an arbitration panel ruled that, while both parties contributed to the demise of the business relationship, Four Seasons had not violated its management agreement.  The arbitrators ordered Broadreach to pay Four Seasons to terminate the contract." The resort is no longer a Four Seasons.

Four Seasons has continued to add more hotels and resorts to its portfolio, notably in China. It opened a new hotel in Hangzhou in 2010 and Guangzhou, Beijing, and a second property in Shanghai in 2012. In India, it has one hotel in Mumbai. In 2013, it opened its first hotel in Russia in the Lobanov-Rostovsky Palace in St. Petersburg, and later opened a second hotel in Moscow. In Indonesia, it has one hotel in Jakarta and another two in Bali.In October 2012, Four Seasons opened a new 259 room Toronto hotel in Yorkville, designed by internationally known design firm Yabu Pushelberg. The hotel includes an upscale restaurant led by celebrity chef Daniel Boulud. It was hailed by The Globe and Mail as "the renewal of an iconic Canadian brand in its hometown". The penthouse was bought by entrepreneur Robert Österlund (founder of Xacti, LLC and Inbox.com) for a Canadian record price of over $28 million.

In 2009, founder Sharp wrote a memoir titled Four Seasons: The Story of Business Philosophy. It contained a historical chronicle of the hotels since its inception.

In September 2021, Cascade announced it will increase its existing 47.5% stake to 71.25% by purchasing, for $2.21 billion in cash, half of the existing 47.5% stake owned by the Saudi Kingdom Holding Company (KHC).

Business model

Four Seasons does not own any of its properties; it operates them on behalf of real estate owners and developers.  For example, its New York Downtown hotel/residence is owned by Silverstein Properties, and its Las Vegas hotel is part of the Mandalay Bay complex.  The contracts between Four Seasons and property owners typically permit the company to participate in the design of the property and run it with nearly total control over every aspect of the operation.

Four Seasons generally earns three percent of the gross income and about five percent of profits from the properties it operates. Property owners are required to additionally contribute money for marketing, chain-wide sales, reservations systems and renovations.  Four Seasons hotels have larger staffs than competing chains, and the company maintains separate reserve accounts for each hotel to cover upkeep costs. Profit margins are relatively low, but the brand attracts developers through the hotels' reputation as solid assets for loan collateral or resale.

Residential rentals

Four Seasons Hotels and Resorts began offering vacation rentals in June 2014. Titled Residential Rentals, the properties are available in: North America (Costa Rica, Houston, Jackson Hole, Nevis, Punta Mita, San Diego, Whistler, Vail). Africa (Marrakech, Mauritius, Seychelles, Sharm El Sheikh), Europe (Cap-Ferrat) and Asia (Jimbaran Bay, Chiang Mai, Koh Samui).

Residential Rentals provide the same services as Four Seasons Hotels and Resorts in a residential setting. Customers are mainly multi-generational vacationers and small group travellers.

The first stand alone Four Seasons Private Residences opened in London at 20 Grosvenor Square, Mayfair in July 2019. It will be the third Four Seasons venue in London.

Locations

North America 

Four Seasons has a total of 48 hotels in North America.

Central and South America 

Four Seasons has a total of 4 hotels in Central and South America.

Europe 

Four Seasons has a total of 20 hotels in Europe.

Middle East and Africa 

Four Seasons has a total of 22 hotels in the Middle East and Africa.

Asia and Pacific 

Four Seasons has a total of 25 hotels in Asia and the Pacific region.

Four Seasons Yachts 
In September 2022, the Four Seasons announced it was launching Four Seasons Yachts, with its first super yacht scheduled to hit the high seas in 2025.

Critical reception

Travel + Leisure magazine and Zagat Survey rank the hotel chain's properties among the top luxury hotels worldwide. Readers of Conde Nast Traveler magazine have voted Four Seasons Tented Camp Golden Triangle in Chiang Rai, Thailand as among the top ten hotels in the world for three consecutive years. The company has been named one of the "100 Best Companies to Work For" by Fortune every year since the survey's inception in 1998, ranking No. 47 in 2015, and is lauded for having one of the lowest employee turnover rates in the hospitality industry.

In recent years, restaurants at Four Seasons hotels and resorts have been recognized by Zagat and Michelin.  The latter has awarded a total of 29 stars to 20 of the company's restaurants, including Four Seasons Hotel Hong Kong (three restaurants), Paris (three restaurants), Beijing (two restaurants) and Florence.

Philanthropy
The company and its hotels and resorts have been involved in a number of philanthropic programs, with a focus on supporting sustainability, building communities,  and advancing cancer research.  Four Seasons was one of the founders of the Terry Fox Run in 1981, which has since grown into the world's largest single day cancer fundraiser, with events around the world every September.  To date, the Terry Fox Run has raised more than CAD 750 million.

In 2001, Four Seasons Resort Maldives started collaborating with the local environmental organization Seamarc/Marine savers, which has set up a program of reimplantation of coral in damaged areas.

On June 19, 2002, the Canadian Opera Company announced Four Seasons Hotels as the naming donor for the COC's new Opera House, also home to the National Ballet of Canada, the Four Seasons Centre for the Performing Arts, located in Toronto, Ontario.

See also

References

Cascade Investment affiliate to acquire controlling stake in Four Seasons for $2.21B

External links

 
Hotel and leisure companies of Canada
Multinational companies headquartered in Canada
Companies based in Toronto
Hotels established in 1960
Canadian companies established in 1960
Canadian brands
1960 establishments in Ontario
Luxury brands
Privately held companies of Canada
Hotel chains in Canada
Private equity portfolio companies
Sovereign wealth fund portfolio companies
2007 mergers and acquisitions